Breweries in Missouri produce a wide range of beers in different styles that are marketed locally, regionally, nationally, and internationally. The greatest concentration of breweries is in the Greater St. Louis area, which is home to at least 65 different breweries, including a number of brewpubs and microbreweries.  St. Louis is also the North American headquarters of Anheuser-Busch InBev, one of the world's largest brewers. Brewing companies vary widely in the volume and variety of beer produced,  from small nanobreweries and microbreweries to massive multinational conglomerate macrobreweries.

In 2012 Missouri's 58 brewing establishments (including breweries, brewpubs, importers, and company-owned packagers and wholesalers) employed 3,890 people directly, and more than 21,000 others in related jobs such as wholesaling and retailing. Altogether 51 people in Missouri had active brewer permits in 2012.

Including people directly employed in brewing, as well as those who supply Missouri's breweries with everything from ingredients to machinery, the total business and personal tax revenue generated by Missouri's breweries and related industries was more than $2.5 billion. Consumer purchases of Missouri's brewery products generated more than $142 million extra in tax revenue. In 2012, according to the Brewers Association, Missouri ranked 23rd in the number of craft breweries per capita with 47.

For context, at the end of 2013 there were 2,822 breweries in the United States, including 2,768 craft breweries subdivided into 1,237 brewpubs, 1,412 microbreweries and 119 regional craft breweries.  In that same year, according to the Beer Institute, the brewing industry employed around 43,000 Americans in brewing and distribution and had a combined economic impact of more than $246 billion.

Breweries

Former breweries
 Falstaff Brewing Corporation - the once large brewery based in St. Louis
 George Muehlebach Brewing Company - in Kansas City, purchased by Joseph Schlitz Brewing Company in the 1950s, discontinued in 1973
 Kirkwood Station Brewery - in Kirkwood, MO opened in 2009 and closed on February 28, 2019
 Lemp Brewery - a former brewery in St. Louis

See also 
 Beer in the United States
 List of breweries in the United States
 List of microbreweries

References

Missouri
Breweries